Lego Scooby-Doo: Knight Time Terror (also known as Scooby-Doo! Knight Time Terror) is a movie special in Lego animation, based upon the Scooby-Doo Saturday morning cartoons. It was created to promote the new Scooby-Doo Lego sets, which aired on Cartoon Network on November 25, 2015.

Plot

The gang visits Grimsley Manor, where they have to solve the mystery of a Black Knight who has come to life.

Cast

 Frank Welker as Scooby-Doo, Fred Jones
 Matthew Lillard as Shaggy Rogers
 Kate Micucci as Velma Dinkley
 Grey Griffin as Daphne Blake
 Phil Morris as Adam, Phil (credited as Treasure Hunter #1)
 Sean Schemmel as Charlie Grimsley, Treasure Hunter #2
 Jason Spisak as Kyle Grimsley, Black Knight
 Colleen Villard as Wanda Grimsley

Broadcast
LEGO Scooby-Doo: Knight Time Terror made its global debut on Teletoon in Canada on October 2, 2015. The special premiered on Boomerang channels in the United Kingdom and Ireland in late October 2015 and debuted in Australia and New Zealand on January 26, 2016.

Reception
The special was watched by 1.67 million viewers and received a 0.4 rating in adults 18-49.

See also
Lego Scooby-Doo
Lego Scooby-Doo! Haunted Hollywood
Lego Scooby-Doo! Blowout Beach Bash

References

External links
 

Scooby-Doo specials
American television films
2010s American animated films
Warner Bros. Animation animated films
Scooby-Doo! Knight Time Terror
Lego Scooby-Doo films
Films directed by Rick Morales